Jan Seyum was King of Zagwe dynasty. Taddesse Tamrat states that he was a son of Mara Takla Haymanot, a younger brother of King Tatadim, and the father of Yemrehana Krestos. His name does not appear in the longer king lists.

References 

11th-century monarchs in Africa
Emperors of Ethiopia
Zagwe dynasty